The 1946 Saint Louis Billikens football team was an American football team that represented Saint Louis University as a member of the Missouri Valley Conference (MVC) during the 1946 college football season. In its seventh season under head coach Dukes Duford, the team compiled a 4–6 record (1–1 against MVC opponents), finished third in the conference, and was outscored by a total of 164 to 160. The team played its home games at Walsh Stadium in St. Louis.

Schedule

References

Saint Louis
Saint Louis Billikens football seasons
Saint Louis Billikens football